Melissa Parke (born 11 August 1966) is a former Australian Labor Party politician and UN human rights lawyer, who served as Member for the federal electoral Division of Fremantle in the Australian House of Representatives from 2007 to 2016. In 2013 Parke was appointed by Prime Minister Kevin Rudd as Minister for International Development and served in that capacity until Labor lost government later that year.

Prior to entering politics, Parke worked as a lawyer for the United Nations. Between 1999 and 2007 she worked for the UN in Kosovo, Lebanon, Gaza, and New York. She also worked as a law lecturer at Murdoch University, the principal solicitor at the Bunbury Community Legal Centre, and in private legal practice in Sydney and Western Australia.

She retired from politics at the 2016 federal election. In September 2017 Parke was appointed as an Ambassador for ICAN (International Campaign to Abolish Nuclear Weapons). In October 2017 ICAN was announced as the winner of the 2017 Nobel Peace Prize for its role in achieving the Treaty on the Prohibition of Nuclear Weapons. In December 2017, and again in 2018, 2019 and 2020, Parke was appointed by the UN Human Rights Commissioner to the "Group of Eminent Experts on Yemen", to investigate human rights violations in Yemen.

In April 2019, she was selected by the Australian Labor Party to contest the federal seat of Curtin, but stepped down from her candidacy following a media campaign against her because of her advocacy for Palestinian rights.

In August 2021 Parke was appointed as Chair of the Western Australian Museum Board of Trustees.

Parke was awarded the Jeruslaem (Al Quds) Peace Prize by the Australia Palestine Advocacy Network (APAN) in 2022, in recognition of her tireless advocacy for Palestinian human rights and justice.

Background and early career
Parke grew up in the south-west of Western Australia on her parents' apple farm in Donnybrook. She attended public schools in Donnybrook and Bunbury and completed a Bachelor of Business (with Distinction) at Curtin University in 1989. This was followed by a law degree at the University of New South Wales and subsequently in 1998 a Master of Laws (LLM) in public international law at Murdoch University where she lectured in 1999.

From 1990 to 1994 Parke worked in law offices in Sydney and Bunbury and from 1994 to 1997 as solicitor-in–charge at the Bunbury Community Legal Centre. It was during this period that she unsuccessfully contested the WA Legislative Assembly seat of Mitchell for Labor at the 1996 election.

United Nations

Parke began her employment as an international lawyer with UNMIK, the United Nations peacekeeping mission in Kosovo from 1999 to 2002 and subsequently worked in Gaza with the United Nations Relief and Works Agency for Palestine Refugees in the Near East (UNRWA) from 2002 to 2004.

In 2004 Parke became a legal adviser in the Office of the Under-Secretary-General for Management in the UN headquarters, New York. In this role, Parke was responsible for aspects of management reform and for the provision of advice and oversight in respect of the UN system of justice administration.

In 2005 and 2006, Parke was seconded from the Department of Management to establish the new UN Ethics Office, laying the foundations for a permanent unit within the UN that would eventually serve 29,000 personnel worldwide in relation to issues of ethics, transparency and good governance.

From mid-2006 to early 2007, Parke worked as the deputy chief of staff and legal adviser in the UN International Independent Investigation Commission (UNIIIC) in Beirut, Lebanon, investigating the assassination of the former Lebanese prime minister Rafik Hariri and other terrorist attacks in Lebanon.

Parke returned to her post in New York in early 2007 and left the United Nations in June of that year to return to Fremantle, Australia to stand for federal parliament.

In December 2017, and again in 2018 and 2019, Parke was appointed by the UN Human Rights Commissioner to the "Group of Eminent Experts on Yemen", to investigate human rights violations in Yemen.

Political career
Parke was first elected as the Member for the Division of Fremantle in the 2007 Australian federal election. Former Prime Minister Bob Hawke campaigned in Fremantle with Parke and the retiring MP Carmen Lawrence. She was re-elected in the 2010 Australian federal election and again in the 2013 Australian federal election. Some notable achievements include negotiating the return of Cantonment Hill from the Australian Defence Force to the City of Fremantle and organising a community cabinet forum in Fremantle in March 2011 attended by prime minister Julia Gillard and key cabinet ministers.

In June 2011 Parke publicly raised concerns about the government's proposal to send asylum-seeker children to Malaysia and in July 2011 Parke was one of nine backbenchers to raise concerns about the government's decision to resume the live export of cattle to Indonesia after the ABC Four Corners program exposed cruel and inhumane treatment of Australian cattle in Indonesian abattoirs.

In February 2013 Parke was promoted to Parliamentary Secretary for Mental Health, Homelessness and Social Housing.

Parke has previously sat on the Joint Standing Committee for Foreign Affairs, Defence, and Trade, the Joint Standing Committee for Treaties, and the Joint Statutory Committee: Australian Commission for Law Enforcement Integrity.

Kevin Rudd appointed Parke as Minister for International Development in his second ministry, a role she served in until Labor lost office in September 2013.

In 2013 Parke was a joint recipient of the Alan Missen award for integrity, awarded by the Accountability Round Table once every three years.

On 22 January 2016, Parke announced her retirement at the next federal election, to spend more time with her family, following her marriage to Perth businessman and patron of the arts, Warwick Hemsley.

In April 2019, she was selected by the Australian Labor Party to contest the federal seat of Curtin in the 2019 federal election. This seat had been held by former Deputy Liberal Leader Julie Bishop since 1998. Parke withdrew her candidacy for the seat following negative media coverage after she was reported to have told a meeting that Israel's treatment of Palestinians was "worse than the South African system of apartheid". She said her views regarding Palestine-Israel were well known but that she did not want them to be a "distraction from electing a Labor government which will take urgent and strong action on climate change".

In January 2020, Parke sued Liberal MP Dave Sharma for defamation over a tweet in which he accused her of anti-semitism and "trafficking in conspiracy theories". She also sued Colin Rubenstein, executive director of the Australia/Israel and Jewish Affairs Council, and the West Australian and Herald Sun newspapers, over a press release from Rubenstein and stories run in the West Australian and Herald Sun that she alleged defamed her. On 8 January 2020 the West Australian published an apology and published an article by Parke. On 26 March 2020, the Herald Sun printed an apology to Parke and published her op-ed entitled Criticism Not Same As Racism.

In October 2020, the Federal Court ruled that Parke was entitled to take up an earlier settlement offer from David Sharma despite initially rejecting it, and the case was consequently dismissed.

In mid-April 2021, Parke withdrew her lawsuit against Rubenstein after the AIJAC executive director released a public statement acknowledging that Parke was not an anti-Semite or any of the other defamatory implications Parke objected to in Rubenstein's April 2019 press releases, and that he regretted the significant distress he had caused.

Other activities
In September 2017 Parke was appointed as an Ambassador for ICAN (International Campaign to Abolish Nuclear Weapons). In October 2017 ICAN was announced as the winner of the 2017 Nobel Peace Prize for its role in achieving the Treaty on the Prohibition of Nuclear Weapons.

In 2019 Parke was elected to the Governing Body of development organisation BRAC, the world's largest NGO.

Over the years Parke's community activities have included acting as a Western Australian representative on the National Council of the Australian Conservation Foundation, as the spokesperson for the Communities for Coastal Conservation, and serving on the management committee of the Waratah Domestic Violence and Sexual Assault Referral Centre.

References

External links
 

1966 births
Australian Labor Party members of the Parliament of Australia
20th-century Australian lawyers
Australian women lawyers
Labor Left politicians
Living people
Members of the Australian House of Representatives for Fremantle
Members of the Australian House of Representatives
People from Donnybrook, Western Australia
Australian officials of the United Nations
University of New South Wales Law School alumni
Women members of the Australian House of Representatives
21st-century Australian politicians
21st-century Australian women politicians
Women government ministers of Australia
21st-century Australian lawyers